Le gang des gaffeurs, written and drawn by Franquin, is the eleven album of the original Gaston Lagaffe series. It is composed of 46 strips previously published in Spirou. It was published in 1973 by Dupuis.

Story
De Mesmaeker is back in the gags.

Inventions
 barbecue: made up of an old lid
 blend of fertilizers: it allows plants to grow very fast, including with carnivorous ones

Background
This is the first album composed of 46 pages. Next albums will also comprise 46 strips.

References

 Gaston Lagaffe classic series on the official website
 Publication in Spirou  on bdoubliées.com.

External links
Official website 

1973 graphic novels
Comics by André Franquin